Tibacuy is a municipality and town of Colombia in the department of Cundinamarca, in Sumapaz Province.

Climate

Etymology 
In the Chibcha language of the Muisca and Panche, Tibacuy means "official chief".

History 
The area of Tibacuy was inhabited by the Muisca and the Panche with the Sutagao living to the southeast. The present town centre is situated at a lower altitude than the original indigenous village. Modern Tibacuy was founded between 13th and 17th of February 1592 by Bernardino de Albornoz.

Economy 
Main economical activity of Tibacuy is agriculture, predominantly coffee, bananas, tomatoes and blackberries.

Archaeology 
In Cumaca, rural part of Tibacuy, petroglyphs have been found.

Gallery

See also 
 Muisca
 Panche
 Sutagao

References 

Municipalities of Cundinamarca Department
Populated places established in 1592
1592 establishments in the Spanish Empire
Muisca Confederation